Saba-248 is an Iranian medium-lift helicopter, which was unveiled on March 7, 2017. It was entirely designed/manufactured by Iranian Defense Ministry. Saba-248 is multi-functional with 2 engines and possesses 8 seats. This skid-equipped twin-engine, four-bladed utility helicopter is able to be deployed to a wide variety of missions, consisting of freight and passenger transport missions, aerial photography, rescue operations and reconnaissance missions.

Use 
This Iranian-made helicopter is capable to be applied as air ambulance/taxi. According to Hossein Dehqan, the Iranian Defense Minister Brigadier General, it has the utilization of modern-technologies in the field of navigation/conduct/mechanical systems, high-speed, remarkable-reliability, acceptable function with sole engine, low-sound and vibration, operating temperature range of -25 °C to 55 °C and also an aerodynamic body.

Unveiling 
This Iranian medium-lift helicopter was unveiled on March 7, 2017 during a ceremony in Tehran, Iran; attended by Iranian Defense Minister Brigadier General Hossein Dehqan and Sorena Sattari Vice-president for Science and Technology Affairs.

References

External links 
 Iran Unveils Advanced Homegrown Copter (+Photos)

Military helicopters
2010s Iranian military aircraft
Iranian military utility aircraft